Maike Becker (born 12 April 1962) is a German handball player who played for the West German national team. She was born in Esens, Lower Saxony. She represented West Germany at the 1984 Summer Olympics in Los Angeles, where the West German team placed fourth.

References

1962 births
Living people
Sportspeople from Lower Saxony
German female handball players
Olympic handball players of West Germany
Handball players at the 1984 Summer Olympics